Liu Xia (Mandarin pronunciation: lʲə́u ɕáː) is a former badminton player from China. 

Liu is one of the players from China who played in the era of split between World Badminton Federation (WBF) and International Badminton Federation (IBF). The Chinese badminton team was the member of WBF due to dispute, she therefore wasn't able to participate in many of the big tournaments which were handled and sanctioned only by the IBF, but still excelled in various continental championships which included Asian Games, Asian Championships and Asian Invitational Championships. She was the gold medalist in the World Championship which rival organisation WBF conducted in 1979.

Career & Early life
In 1970, when Liu Xia was a 15 years of age, she was studying at Chengdu No. 2 Middle School in Shanghai. Being a 15-year-old, it was the first time she was exposed to badminton and thereafter joined the Shanghai team. Just after an year, she got selected to the national badminton training team. Because of her extreme talent in the sport, which included broader skills, coordination of movements, flexible pace, etc. she immediately became the main force of the Chinese women's team. In 1975, Liu travelled to Japan with the Chinese youth team and became the press attention after defeating strongest of Japanese players at that time. After winning several Asian championships, Liu ushered in the pinnacle of her career: in the first World Games badminton competition held in the United States in July 1981, she teamed up with Zhang Ailing to win the women's doubles championship. Due to the organisational divide, the Chinese badminton team failed to participate in the World Championships, Olympic Games and other competitions, and she did not have a bigger stage to show her skills, but proved herself of being an elite player of that generation. 

After retirement, Liu Xia returned to her hometown Shanghai and then went to Thailand as a coach in 1990. She also has her own business in Shanghai. On the one hand, she is in charge of the development department of the East Asian Sports and Cultural Center, and also opened an indoor badminton hall next to the Shanghai Stadium, which holds the "Liu Xia Cup" amateur badminton competition on annual basis.

Achievements

World Games

World Championships

Asian Games

Asian Championships

International tournaments

Invitational tournament

References

External links
 

1955 births
Living people
Chinese female badminton players
Asian Games medalists in badminton
Asian Games silver medalists for China
Asian Games gold medalists for China
Badminton players at the 1978 Asian Games
Medalists at the 1978 Asian Games
World Games medalists in badminton
World Games gold medalists
Competitors at the 1981 World Games
Badminton players from Shanghai